Weinstein is a German or Yiddish surname meaning wine stone, referring to the crystals of cream of tartar (potassium bitartrate) resulting from the process of fermenting grape juice.

List of people with this surname

 Alan Weinstein, mathematician
 Albert Weinstein (1885-1969), German Olympic track and field athlete
 Alexander Weinstein, mathematician
 Allen Weinstein, archivist of the United States
 Andrew Weinstein, British priest, chaplain, and missionary
 Arnold Weinstein, American poet, playwright and librettist
 Bob Weinstein, American film producer
 Bobby Weinstein, American songwriter and singer
 Bret Weinstein, American professor in biology
 Bruce Weinstein, American known as the "Ethics Guy", columnist for BusinessWeek
 Claire Weinstein, American swimmer
 Cordt Weinstein, American soccer player
 Dan Weinstein (disambiguation), several people
 David Weinstein (disambiguation), several people
 Debra Weinstein, American author
 Domenic Weinstein, German professional racing cyclist
 Eric Weinstein, American mathematician and economist
 Garik Kimovich Weinstein, birth name of Russian Garry Kasparov
 Hannah Weinstein, American activist, movie maker
 Harvey Weinstein, American film producer and convicted sex offender
I Bernard Weinstein, American physician
 Iram Weinstein, American engineer
 Irv Weinstein, American television news anchor
 Jack B. Weinstein, United States federal judge
 Jacob Sager Weinstein, American humorist
 James Weinstein (disambiguation), several people
 J. Elvis Weinstein, American writer and performer
 Jeremy S. Weinstein (born 1950), New York politician and judge
 Josh Weinstein, American executive producer of The Simpsons
 Kenneth R. Weinstein, American political theorist
 Lauren Weinstein (disambiguation), several people
 Louis Weinstein (1908–2000), American infectious diseases physician, microbiologist, and educator
 Madge Weinstein, Internet personality
 Matthew Weinstein, American artist
 Michael Weinstein (disambiguation), several people
 Milton Weinstein, American, the Henry J. Kaiser Professor of Health Policy and Management at Harvard T.H. Chan School of Public Health
 Moses M. Weinstein (1912–2007), New York politician and judge
 Nathan Weinstein, better known under his pen name Nathanael West (1903–1940), American writer
 Paul Weinstein (disambiguation), several people
 Raymond Weinstein (born 1941), American chess player
 Samantha Weinstein, Canadian actress
 Selma James Weinstein, American feminist and socialist
 Samuel Weinstein, later Stephen Winsten (1893–1991), British writer
 Shlomo Weinstein, changed name to Shlomo Gazit (born 1926), Israeli head of IDF military intelligence, President of Ben-Gurion University 
 Sidney T. Weinstein, US lieutenant general
 Simcha Weinstein (born 1975), British writer and rabbi
 Stephanie J. Weinstein (born 1967), American nutritionist and epidemiologist 
 Steve Weinstein, American bridge and poker player
 Steven Weinstein (philosopher), Canadian philosopher
Tali Farhadian Weinstein, Iranian-born American former federal prosecutor and current candidate for New York County District Attorney
 Todd Jay Weinstein (born 1951), American photographer
 Yehuda Weinstein, attorney general of Israel
 Yehuda Weisenstein (born 1955), also known as Yehuda Weinstein, Israeli Olympic fencer

Reference Note

See also
 Vainshtein
 Weinstein conjecture
 Weinstein effect
 The Weinstein Company, an independent film studio

Jewish surnames
German-language surnames
Yiddish-language surnames